The Piyavka-class river patrol boat, also known as Project 1249, is a Russian Coast Guard vessel. The patrol craft is designed to operate in rivers to secure and protect Russian maritime borders, enforce navigational laws and other law enforcement duties, and search and rescue. The patrol craft work alongside other Russian Coast Guard and Navy vessels, such as the Moskit-class and the Ogoniok-class river patrol craft. Its hull is not capable of breaking through heavy ice during the winter season.

Design
The patrol craft have a basic design and are powered by diesel engines. The weapon suite allows the craft to engage surface, ground, and air threats and targets, the suite also gives them a good self-defense capability. The vessels basic suite of sensors and systems for navigation and communication allows the vessels to perform the required missions.

See also
List of ships of Russia by project number

References

Patrol vessels of Russia
Patrol boat classes